Wigner's theorem, proved by Eugene Wigner in 1931,  is a cornerstone of the mathematical formulation of quantum mechanics. The theorem specifies how physical symmetries such as rotations, translations, and CPT are represented on the Hilbert space of states.

The physical states in a quantum theory are represented by unit vectors in Hilbert space up to a phase factor, i.e. by the complex line or ray the vector spans. In addition, by the Born rule the absolute value of the unit vectors inner product, or equivalently the cosine squared of the angle between the lines the vectors span, corresponds to the transition probability. Ray space, in mathematics known as projective Hilbert space, is the space of all unit vectors in Hilbert space up to the equivalence relation of differing by a phase factor. By Wigner's theorem, any transformation of ray space that preserves the absolute value of the inner products can be represented by a unitary or antiunitary transformation of Hilbert space, which is unique up to a phase factor. As a consequence, the representation of a symmetry group on ray space can be lifted to a projective representation or sometimes even an ordinary representation on Hilbert space.

Rays and ray space
It is a postulate of quantum mechanics that vectors in Hilbert space that are scalar nonzero multiples of each other represent the same pure state. A ray belonging to the vector  is the complex line through the origin 

.

Two nonzero vectors  define the same ray, if and only if they differ by some nonzero complex number: , . 
Alternatively, we can consider a ray  as a set of vectors with norm 1 that span the same line, a unit ray, by intersecting the line  with the unit sphere 
. 
Two unit vectors  then define the same unit ray  if they differ by a phase factor: . 
This is the more usual picture in physics. 
The set of rays is in one to one correspondence with the set of unit rays and we can identify them.  
There is also a one-to-one correspondence between physical pure states  and (unit)rays  given by 

where  is the orthogonal projection on the line .

The space of all rays is called ray space. It can be defined in several ways.
 and define ray space as

Alternatively define a relation ≅ as an equivalence relation on the sphere .  The unit ray space , is an incarnation of ray space defined (making no notational distinction with ray space) as the set of equivalence classes

A third equivalent definition of ray space is as pure state ray space i.e. as density matrices that are orthogonal projections of rank 1

 
Each of these definitions make it clear that ray space is nothing but another name for projective Hilbert space.
If  is finite,  has real dimension . 
In fact,  is a compact complex manifold of dimension  which (by choosing a basis) is isomorphic to the projective space . For example, the Bloch sphere

is isomorphic to the Riemann sphere .
 
Ray space (i.e. projective space) takes a little getting used to, but is a very well studied object that predates quantum mechanics going back to the study of perspective by renaissance artists. It is not a vector space with well-defined linear combinations of rays. However, for every two vectors  and ratio of complex numbers  (i.e. element of ) there is a well defined ray .

The Hilbert space structure on  defines additional structure on ray space. Define the ray correlation (or ray product)

Note that the righthand side is independent of the choice of representatives.

i.e. we can define Born's rule on ray space by.

The angle then turns out to satisfy the triangle inequality and defines a metric structure on ray space which comes from a Riemannian metric, the Fubini-Study metric.

Symmetry transformations
Loosely speaking, a symmetry transformation is a change in which "nothing happens" or a "change in our point of view" that does not change the outcomes of possible experiments. For example, translating a system in a homogeneous environment should have no qualitative effect on the outcomes of experiments made on the system. Likewise for rotating a system in an isotropic environment. This becomes even clearer when one considers the mathematically equivalent passive transformations, i.e. simply changes of coordinates and let the system be. Usually, the domain and range Hilbert spaces are the same. An exception would be (in a non-relativistic theory) the Hilbert space of electron states that is subjected to a charge conjugation transformation. In this case the electron states are mapped to the Hilbert space of positron states and vice versa. However this means that the symmetry acts on the direct sum of the Hilbert spaces.

A transformation of a physical system is a transformation of states, hence mathematically a transformation, not of the Hilbert space, but of its ray space. Hence, in quantum mechanics, a transformation of a physical system gives rise to a bijective ray transformation 

Physical transformations must preserve Born's rule.

For a physical transformation, the transition probabilities in the transformed and untransformed systems should be preserved:

A bijective ray transformation  is called a symmetry transformation iff

A geometric interpretation, is that a symmetry transformation is an isometry of ray space.

Some facts about symmetry transformations that can be verified using the definition:
 The product of two symmetry transformations, i.e. two symmetry transformations applied in succession, is a symmetry transformation.
 Any symmetry transformation has an inverse.
 The identity transformation is a symmetry transformation.
 Multiplication of symmetry transformations is associative.

The set of symmetry transformations thus forms a group, the symmetry group of the system. Some important frequently occurring subgroups in the symmetry group of a system are realizations of
 The symmetric group with its subgroups. This is important on the exchange of particle labels.
 The Poincaré group. It encodes the fundamental symmetries of spacetime [NB: a symmetry is defined above as a map on the ray space describing a given system, the notion of symmetry of spacetime has not been defined and is not clear].
 Internal symmetry groups like SU(2) and SU(3). They describe so called internal symmetries, like isospin and color charge peculiar to quantum mechanical systems.

These groups are also referred to as symmetry groups of the system.

Statement of Wigner's theorem

Preliminaries
Some preliminary definitions are needed to state the theorem. A transformation  of Hilbert spaces is unitary if it is bijective and

Since 

Likewise, a transformation  is antiunitary if it is bijective and

As above, an antiunitary transformation is necessarily antilinear. Both variants are real linear and additive.

Given a unitary transformation  of Hilbert spaces, define

This is a symmetry transformation since

In the same way an antiunitary transformation of Hilbert space induces a symmetry transformation. One says that a transformation  of Hilbert spaces is compatible with the transformation  of ray spaces if  or equivalently

for all .

Transformations of Hilbert space induced by either a unitary linear transformation or an antiunitary antilinear operator are obviously compatible with the transformations or ray space they induce as described.

Statement
Wigner's theorem states a converse of the above:

 
Antiunitary and antilinear transformations are less prominent in physics. They are all related to a reversal of the direction of the flow of time.

For example, one might be tempted to believe that
 
In fact such a  would not be additive. 

Remark 2: Whether  must be represented by a unitary or antiunitary operator is determined by topology. If , the second cohomology  has a unique generator  such that for a (equivalently for every) complex projective line , one has . Since  is a homeomorphism,  also generates  and so we have . If  is unitary, then  while if  is anti linear then .

Remark 3: Wigner's theorem is in close connection with the fundamental theorem of projective geometry

Representations and projective representations

From the uniqueness part of Wigner's theorem, one has for the compatible representatives ,

where  is a phase factor.

The function  is called a -cocycle or Schur multiplier. A map  satisfying the above relation for some vector space  is called a projective representation or a ray representation. If , then it is called a representation.

One should note that the terminology differs between mathematics and physics. In the linked article, term projective representation has a slightly different meaning, but the term as presented here enters as an ingredient and the mathematics per se is of course the same. If the realization of the symmetry group, is given in terms of action on the space of unit rays , then it is a projective representation  in the mathematical sense, while its representative on Hilbert space is a projective representation  in the physical sense.

They also satisfy

Upon redefinition of the phases,

which is allowed by last theorem, one finds

where the hatted quantities are defined by

Utility of phase freedom

The freedom of choice of phases can be used to simplify the phase factors. For some groups the phase can be eliminated altogether.

In the case of the Lorentz group and its subgroup the rotation group SO(3), phases can, for projective representations, be chosen such that . For their respective universal covering groups, SL(2,C) and Spin(3), it is according to the theorem possible to have , i.e. they are proper representations.

The study of redefinition of phases involves group cohomology. If an element of  contains the trivial function , then it is said to be trivial. The topic can be studied at the level of Lie algebras and Lie algebra cohomology as well.

Assuming the projective representation  is weakly continuous, two relevant theorems can be stated. An immediate consequence of (weak) continuity is that the identity component is represented by unitary operators.

See also
 Particle physics and representation theory

Remarks

Notes

References

Further reading

Hilbert space
Theorems in quantum mechanics